The 2016–17 Navy Midshipmen men's basketball team represented the United States Naval Academy during the 2016–17 NCAA Division I men's basketball season. The Midshipmen, led by sixth-year head coach Ed DeChellis, played their home games at Alumni Hall in Annapolis, Maryland and are members of the Patriot League. They finished the season 16–16, 10–8 in Patriot League play to finish in fourth place. In the Patriot League tournament, they defeated Holy Cross in the quarterfinals before losing to top-seeded Bucknell in the semifinals.

Previous season
The Midshipmen finished the 2015–16 season 19–14, 9–9 in Patriot League play to finish in a four-way tie for fourth place. They defeated Lafayette in the first round of the Patriot League tournament before losing in the quarterfinals to Lehigh. Despite having 19 wins, they did not participate in a postseason tournament.

Offseason

Departures

Roster

Schedule and results

|-
!colspan=9 style=| Non-conference regular season

|-
!colspan=9 style=| Patriot League regular season

|-
!colspan=9 style=| Patriot League tournament

References

Navy Midshipmen men's basketball seasons
Navy
Navy
Navy